Eoghan Carrach Ó Siadhail (fl. c. 1500–1550) was a poet from County Donegal who wrote in Irish.

Biography

Eoghan Carrach was a member of the Ó Siadhail family of Tír Chonaill (now County Donegal). Under the patronage of Niall Connallach (Niall Óg Ó Neill, died 1544), he made a copy of Beatha Cholm Cille. It now exists as Trinity College Dublin, MS A. 8.

See also

 Ó Siadhail
 James Shields (Ohio politician)
 Frank Shields
 Micheal O'Siadhail, poet
 Seán Ó Siadhail

References

 Lámhscríbhinní Gaeilge: Treoirliosta, Padraig de Brún, Dublin, 1988.
 Tyrone's Gaelic Literary Legacy, by Diarmaid Ó Diobhlin, in Tyrone: History and Society, 403–432, ed. Charles Dillon and Henry A. Jefferies, Geography Publications, Dublin, 2000. .

16th-century Irish writers
16th-century deaths
People from County Donegal
People from County Tyrone
Irish-language poets
Medieval Irish poets
Medieval Irish writers
Year of birth unknown
Irish male poets
Irish scribes